The Men's Freestyle welterweight at the 1968 Summer Olympics as part of the wrestling program were held at the Insurgentes Ice Rink from October 17 to October 20. The welterweight allowed wrestlers up to 78 kilograms.

Tournament results 
The competition used a form of negative points tournament, with negative points given for any result short of a fall. Accumulation of 6 negative points eliminated the wrestler. When only two or three wrestlers remain, a special final round is used to determine the order of the medals.

Legend
TF — Won by Fall
DQ — Won by Passivity or forfeit
D2 — Both wrestlers lost by Passivity
DNA — Did not appear

Penalties
0 — Won by Fall and Disqualification
0.5 — Won by Technical Superiority
1 — Won by Points
2 — Draw
2.5 — Draw, Passivity
3 — Lost by Points
3.5 — Lost by Technical Superiority
4 — Lost by Fall and Disqualification

1st round

2nd round

3rd round

4th round

5th round

Final round

Final standings

References

Sources
 Trueblood, Beatrice (ed). (1969). Official Report of the Organizing Committee of the Games of the XIX Olympiad Mexico 1968 (Volume 3). pp. 335, 721-722.

Freestyle 78kg